The 24th Government of Ireland (15 December 1994 – 26 June 1997) was the government formed after the Labour Party had left its previous coalition with Fianna Fáil two years into the 27th Dáil. It was a coalition of Fine Gael, with leader John Bruton as Taoiseach, Labour, with Dick Spring as Tánaiste, and Democratic Left, led by Proinsias De Rossa, known as the Rainbow Coalition, it was a coalition of Fine Gael, the Labour Party and Democratic Left. It is the only time to date that a new government was formed within the same Dáil term composed of a different coalition of parties.

The 24th Government lasted  days.

Formation

The Labour Party had been part of the 23rd Government with Fianna Fáil, formed in January 1993 after the 1992 general election, but left in November 1994 following a number of scandals, particularly those which emerged from the Beef Tribunal and the alleged mishandling of the prosecution of paedophile priest Brendan Smyth. After Albert Reynolds was replaced as Fianna Fáil leader by Bertie Ahern, there was speculation that Labour would rejoin Fianna Fáil in government, but instead it formed a government with two parties which had been in opposition. By-election gains since 1992 meant the three parties had enough TDs between them for an overall majority.

Nomination of Taoiseach
In the Dáil debate on the nomination for Taoiseach, Fianna Fáil leader Bertie Ahern and Fine Gael leader John Bruton were proposed. Ahern was defeated by 67 votes to 94, while Bruton was approved. Bruton was appointed as Taoiseach by President Mary Robinson.

Members of the Government
After his appointment as Taoiseach by the president, John Bruton proposed the members of the government and they were approved by the Dáil. They were appointed by the president on the same day.

Attorney General
Dermot Gleeson SC was appointed by the president as Attorney General on the nomination of the Taoiseach.

Ministers of State
On 15 December 1994, Seán Barrett, TD was appointed by the government to the post of Minister for State at the Department of the Taoiseach with special responsibility as Government Chief Whip. Also on the same day Pat Rabbitte, TD was appointed to the position of Minister of State to the Government. This was the first time a Minister of State other than the Chief Whip attended cabinet. On 20 December 1994, the Government appointed the other Ministers of State on the nomination of the Taoiseach.

Constitutional referendums
The Fifteenth Amendment was proposed by Minister for Equality and Law Reform Mervyn Taylor and approved in a referendum on 24 November 1995. It removed the prohibition on divorce, replacing it terms allowing a court to dissolve a marriage, including a requirement to have been separated for four of the previous five years. It was followed by Family Law (Divorce) Act 1996.

The Sixteenth Amendment was proposed by Minister for Justice Nora Owen and approved in a referendum on 28 November 1996. It allowed a court to refuse bail to someone convicted of a serious offence when reasonably considered necessary to prevent the commission of a serious offence by that person. It was followed by the Bail Act 1997.

Confidence in the government	
After the government had failed to properly effect the dismissal of Judge Dominic Lynch, a motion of no confidence was proposed in the government. This was debated on 12 and 13 November 1996 as a motion of confidence in the government, proposed by the Taoiseach. It was approved by a vote of 79 to 70.

Dissolution
On 15 May 1997, the president dissolved the Dáil on the advice of the Taoiseach, and a general election was held on 6 June. When the 28th Dáil met on 26 June, Bertie Ahern was nominated and appointed as Taoiseach and formed a Fianna Fáil–Progressive Democrats coalition government.

References

1994 establishments in Ireland
1997 disestablishments in Ireland
27th Dáil
Cabinets established in 1994
Cabinets disestablished in 1997
Coalition governments of Ireland
Governments of Ireland